Hedda Zinner, or Hedda Erpenbeck-Zinner (20 May 1904 – 4 July 1994), was a German political writer, actress, comedian, journalist and radio director.

Biography
Hedda Zinner was born in Lemberg on May 20, 1904. She attended the Acting Academy there from 1923 to 1925. Zinner began working as an actress but her interest in the workers' movement led her to move to Berlin and, in 1929, join the Communist Party of Germany. She became a journalist for left-wing journals. When Hitler came to power, she moved to Vienna and then Prague, where she founded the cabaret Studio 34 in 1934. In 1935 she emigrated to Moscow. After the Second World War she settled in East Berlin. In 1980, Zinner was awarded the Order of Karl Marx. 

Zinner also wrote under the pseudonym Elisabeth Frank. Her granddaughter is the writer Jenny Erpenbeck.

Works
 Nur eine Frau [Only a Woman] (1954). A novel about the life of Louise Otto-Peters.
 Ahnen und Erben [Ancestors and Inheritors] (1968). Vol. 1 of her autobiography.
 Die Schwestern [Sisters] (1970). Vol. 2 of her autobiography.

References

1900s births
1994 deaths
Journalists from Lviv
Communist Party of Germany politicians
Socialist Unity Party of Germany politicians
Refugees from Nazi Germany in the Soviet Union
Recipients of the Patriotic Order of Merit
Recipients of the National Prize of East Germany
20th-century German women writers
20th-century German writers